Carapulcra, or carapulca, is an ancient Andean dish that has been prepared for centuries by both Quechua peoples and Aymara peoples. In ancient times llama meat or alpaca meat would have been used, and some people still use these meats today. It is usually eaten with rice, boiled potatoes or yuca.

See also
 List of Peruvian dishes

References

Peruvian cuisine